Athletics is a sport in Russia. Russian athletes competed in international athletics competitions such as Olympic Games or World athletics championships. Athletics was governed in Russia by the All-Russia Athletic Federation. The World Anti-Doping Agency (WADA) found widespread doping and large-scale cover ups by the Russian authorities, the All-Russia Athletic Federation (ARAF) was declared non-compliant with respect to the World Anti-Doping Code, and in 2015 the IAAF council overwhelmingly voted in favour of prohibiting Russia from world sports events with immediate effect. ARAF accepted the indefinite IAAF suspension. , due to the 2022 Russian invasion of Ukraine, World Athletics has banned all Russian athletes, support personnel, and officials from all World Athletics Series events for the foreseeable future, including those with ANA status. Beginning in March 2022, after the 2022 Russian invasion of Ukraine, the Diamond League excluded Russian and Belarusian athletes from all of its track and field meetings.

Russian athletes at international competitions

Medal tables

Olympic Games
As the Russian Empire, the nation first competed at the 1900 Games, and returned again in 1908 and 1912. After the Russian revolution in 1917, and the subsequent establishment of the Soviet Union in 1922, it would be thirty years until Russian athletes once again competed at the Olympics, at the 1952 Summer Olympics in Helsinki. Following the dissolution of the Soviet Union in 1991, Russian athletes participated in the 1992 Summer Olympics in Barcelona as part of the Unified Team.

Doping ban 

In December 2014, a documentary by German broadcaster ARD made wide-ranging allegations of state involvement in systematic doping in Russian athletics, accusing Russia of an "East German-style" doping programme. The allegations resulted in the resignation of ARAF President Valentin Balakhnichevas Treasurer of the International Association of Athletics Federations (IAAF).

The World Anti-Doping Agency (WADA) subsequently investigated the allegations. The 323-page report, published on 9 November 2015, confirmed widespread doping and large-scale cover ups by the authorities. It recommended that the All-Russia Athletic Federation (ARAF) be declared non-compliant with respect to the World Anti-Doping Code, and recommended that the International Olympic Committee not accept any entries from ARAF until compliance was reached. Based on this report, which The Guardian described as "damning", the IAAF council overwhelmingly voted 22–1 in favour of prohibiting Russia from world sports events with immediate effect, in its 13 November session. Russia has been also prohibited from hosting the 2016 World Race Walking Team Championships (Cheboksary) and 2016 World Junior Championships (Kazan), and ARAF must entrust doping cases to Court of Arbitration for Sport. ARAF accepted the indefinite IAAF suspension and did not request a hearing. ARAF's efforts towards regaining full IAAF membership will be monitored by a five-person IAAF team.

Russian invasion of Ukraine ban
, due to the 2022 Russian invasion of Ukraine, World Athletics banned all Russian athletes, support personnel, and officials from all World Athletics Series events for the foreseeable future, including those with ANA status. Beginning in March 2022, after the 2022 Russian invasion of Ukraine, the Diamond League excluded Russian and Belarusian athletes from all of its track and field meetings.

See also

 List of Russian records in athletics
 All-Russia Athletic Federation

References

External links
 Russian Athletics at Summer Olympics

 
Russia
Russia
Athletics
Russia